Archē in ancient Greek religion was the muse of origins and beginnings. She was one of the five later identified (Boeotian) muses. Nine different muses were later named which became known as the Olympian Muses, daughters of Zeus and Mnemosyne, which is more familiar in classical descriptions of the muses. She is mentioned in Cicero's De Natura Deorum.

See also
 List of Greek mythological figures

Greek goddesses
Greek Muses